Prince Alban Oniangué (born 4 November 1988) is a professional footballer who plays as a midfielder. Born in France, he represents the Republic of the Congo at international level.

Club career
Born in Paris, Oniangué joined the youth system at Rennes in 2005 from Caen and made his senior debut in 2008. On 31 July 2009 Rennes announced that Oniangué would join Ligue 2 side Angers on loan for the 2009–10 season. He made 31 appearances during the loan.

He left Rennes and joined Ligue 2 club Tours on 6 August 2010, signing a three-year contract. On 4 June 2013, Oniangué agreed to join Ligue 1 side Reims on a three-year contract. In December 2014 he extended his contract at the club until 2019.

On 15 August 2016, Oniangué signed a four-year contract with English Championship side Wolverhampton Wanderers for an undisclosed fee. He made his club debut on 20 August 2016 coming on as a substitute in a 3–1 win against Birmingham City. He scored his first goal for the club on 10 September 2016 in a 1–1 draw against Burton Albion.

After falling out of favour with then Wolves head coach Paul Lambert, on 16 January 2017, Oniangué joined Ligue 1 club Bastia for the rest of the 2016–17 season.

In January 2018, he joined Angers for second half of the 2017–18 season. On 12 July 2018, Oniangué moved to Ligue 1 club Caen on a permanent deal. In June 2022, he was released from the club at the expiration of his contract.

International career

Oniangué made his debut for the Congo national team in a 2010 World Cup qualifying match against Sudan on 11 October 2008.

On 21 January 2015, Oniangué scored the only goal of a 2015 Africa Cup of Nations group match against Gabon to give Congo its first win at the Africa Cup of Nations since 1974.

Career statistics

Club

International

International goals
Scores and results list Congo's goal tally first.

References

External links

1988 births
Living people
Footballers from Paris
Association football midfielders
Republic of the Congo footballers
Republic of the Congo international footballers
French footballers
French expatriate footballers
French sportspeople of Republic of the Congo descent
Stade Rennais F.C. players
Angers SCO players
Tours FC players
Stade de Reims players
Wolverhampton Wanderers F.C. players
SC Bastia players
Stade Malherbe Caen players
Ligue 1 players
Ligue 2 players
English Football League players
Expatriate footballers in England
2015 Africa Cup of Nations players
French expatriate sportspeople in England
Republic of the Congo expatriate footballers
Republic of the Congo expatriate sportspeople in England